Patrice Garande (born 27 November 1960) is a French former professional footballer who played as a striker, currently a manager.

Playing career

Club
Born in Oullins, Rhône, Garande finished his development at AS Saint-Étienne, but appeared rarely for the first team during his tenure. In 1981, following a spell in the Swiss Super League with CS Chênois, he signed with AJ Auxerre, scoring a career-best 21 goals in the 1983–84 season to help them finish in third place in Ligue 1 and becoming top scorer in the process.

After leaving the Stade de l'Abbé-Deschamps in the summer of 1986, Garande went on to represent, in the French top division, FC Nantes, Saint-Étienne, Montpellier HSC, Le Havre AC and FC Sochaux-Montbéliard, eventually amassing competition totals of 314 matches and 97 goals. He retired at the age of 34, after a stint with amateurs US Orléans for which he had already played in Ligue 2.

International
Garande was part of the French Olympic team that won the gold medal at the 1984 Summer Olympics in Los Angeles. He won his only cap for the full side on 27 April 1988, in a 0–0 friendly away draw in Northern Ireland.

Coaching career
In 1995, Garande joined Stade Malherbe Caen as assistant to Pierre Mankowski. He moved to AS Cherbourg Football in directorial capacities in January 1999, being named head coach the following year and achieving promotion to the Championnat National.

In June 2012, following Caen's relegation to the second division, Garande replaced fired Franck Dumas as manager. After a third place in the 2013–14 campaign and the subsequent promotion, the side managed to avoid relegation after a spectacular comeback, and his contract was renewed until 2017.

After again leading the club to top-flight survival, Garande left the Stade Michel d'Ornano in May 2018. Two years later, he was appointed at Toulouse FC who had just finished last in the abridged 2019–20 Ligue 1.

On 23 August 2021, Garande was hired by second-tier Dijon FCO.

References

External links

1960 births
Living people
People from Oullins
Sportspeople from Lyon Metropolis
French footballers
Footballers from Auvergne-Rhône-Alpes
Association football forwards
Ligue 1 players
Ligue 2 players
AS Saint-Étienne players
US Orléans players
AJ Auxerre players
FC Nantes players
RC Lens players
Montpellier HSC players
Le Havre AC players
FC Sochaux-Montbéliard players
Bourges 18 players
Swiss Super League players
CS Chênois players
France international footballers
Olympic footballers of France
Footballers at the 1984 Summer Olympics
Medalists at the 1984 Summer Olympics
Olympic medalists in football
Olympic gold medalists for France
French expatriate footballers
Expatriate footballers in Switzerland
French expatriate sportspeople in Switzerland
French football managers
Ligue 1 managers
Ligue 2 managers
AS Cherbourg Football managers
Stade Malherbe Caen managers
Toulouse FC managers
Dijon FCO managers